Korybut is a Polish coat of arms. It was used by the Princely House of Wiśniowiecki-Zbaraski and several branches of the House of Nieświcki in the times of the Polish–Lithuanian Commonwealth.

Notable bearers
Notable bearers of this coat of arms include:
 House of Wiśniowiecki
  Dymitr "Bajda" Wiśniowiecki (leader of the Ukrainian Cossacks, Hetman of the Registered Cossacks.
 Janusz Wiśniowiecki (Master of the Stables of the Crown.)
 Dymitr Jerzy Wiśniowiecki (Great Guard and Hetman of the Crown, voivode of Belz and Kraków)
  Janusz Antoni Wisniowiecki
 Jeremi Wiśniowiecki (Prince at Wiśniowiec, Łubny and Chorol, Palatine of Ruthenia.)
 Michał Korybut Wiśniowiecki (King of the Polish–Lithuanian Commonwealth 1669–1673.)
 Michał Serwacy Wiśniowiecki (Hetman, Castellan and Voivode of Vilnius, Great Chancellor of Lithuania)
 House of Zbaraski
 Krzysztof Zbaraski (Master of the Stables of the Crown, diplomat and a politician.)
 Jerzy Zbaraski (Krajczy and Podczaszy of the Crown, Castellan of Kraków.)

Gallery

See also
 Polish heraldry
 Heraldic family
 List of Polish nobility coats of arms

Bibliography
 Bartosz Paprocki: Herby rycerstwa polskiego na pięcioro ksiąg rozdzielone, Kraków, 1584.
 Tadeusz Gajl: Herbarz polski od średniowiecza do XX wieku : ponad 4500 herbów szlacheckich 37 tysięcy nazwisk 55 tysięcy rodów. L&L, 2007. .

Korybut